Celtic festivals celebrate Celtic culture, which in modern times may be via dance, Celtic music, food, Celtic art, or other mediums. Ancient Celtic festivals included religious and seasonal events such as bonfires, harvest festivals, storytelling and music festivals, and dance festivals.  This list includes Celtic festivals held throughout the world.

History
There are several specific and often ancient types of Celtic festivals. A  (plural ) is a traditional Gaelic arts and culture festival, currently used referring to Irish dance competitions. In Ancient Ireland communities placed great importance on local festivals, where Gaels could come together in song, dance, music, theatre and sport. Today the Fèis has experienced something of a rebirth, both for ethnic Gaels and for enthusiasts of the Gaelic culture in Ireland and Scotland, and worldwide. Other ancient festivals include the eisteddfod, which is a Welsh festival of literature, music and performance dating back to at least the 12th century. The present-day format owes much to an eighteenth-century revival arising out of a number of informal eisteddfodau. Comparable to the eisteddfod but without the ancient roots, the Mòd is a festival of Scottish Gaelic song, arts and culture. There are both local mods and an annual national Mòd, the Royal National Mòd, which take the form of formal competitions, with choral events and traditional music including fiddle, bagpipe and folk groups. There are spoken word events, original dramas, and competitions in written literature.

The concept of modern Celtic identity evolved during the course of the 19th-century into the Celtic Revival and the growth of Celtic nations. After World War II, the focus of the Celticity movement shifted to linguistic revival and protectionism, e.g. protecting Celtic languages. The Celtic revival also led to the emergence of musical and artistic styles identified as Celtic. Music typically drew on folk traditions within the Celtic nations, and instruments such as Celtic harp. Art drew on decorative styles associated with the ancient Celts and with early medieval Celtic Christianity, along with folk-styles. Cultural events to promote "inter-Celtic" cultural exchange also emerged, including festivals.

Celtic festivals by country

Oceania

Australia
Australia Day Celtic Festival in North Sydney, New South Wales
Australian Celtic Festival in Glen Innes, New South Wales
Balaklava Eisteddfod in Balaklava, South Australia
Beechworth Celtic Festival in Beechworth, Victoria
Berry Celtic Festival in Berry, New South Wales
Celtica Festival in Port Adelaide, South Australia
Kangaroo Valley Celtic Gala Day in Kangaroo Valley, New South Wales
Kapunda Celtic Festival in Kapunda, South Australia
Kernewek Lowender in Moonta, South Australia
Kilmore Celtic Festival in Kilmore, Victoria
National Celtic Festival in Portarlington, Victoria
Scots Day Out in Bendigo, Victoria
The Gathering in Ipswich, Queensland

Europe
Paganfest (Tour through Europe)

Switzerland
Guinness Irish Festival, in Sion
Festival Celtique de Corbeyrier, in Corbeyrier

Czech Republic
Lughnasad - The International festival of Celtic culture, in Nasavrky
Keltska Noc / Celtic Night - International Music Festival, in Plumlov
Skotské hry Sychrov - The Festival of Scottish culture,

France
 Paris Celtic Live (Paris, France)
 Brandivy (section Breizh-Kernow Festival) (Brittany)
Festival Celtique du Gévaudan, in Grèzes, Lozère
Festival Euroceltes, in Strasbourg
Celtes Espaces, in Argenteuil
Festival de Cornouaille (Quimper, France)
Kan ar Bobl (Pontivy, France)
Les Nuits Celtiques du Stade de France (Paris, France)
Festival Interceltique de Lorient (Lorient, France)

Germany
 Nagold Keltenfest, Nagold, Germany

Ireland
Arcadian Fields - Bellurgan House (Dundalk, Ireland)
Ballyshannon Medieval Day/Lá Meánaois Bhéal Átha Seanaidh (Ballyshannon, Ireland)
 Biddy's Day - Imbolc (Killorglin, Ireland)
Fleadh Cheoil  (Tullamore, Ireland)
Imram, a festival dedicated to Irish literature in the Irish-language.
 Oireachtas na Gaeilge
 Pan Celtic Festival
 Puck Fair (Killorglin, Ireland)
Seachtain na Gaeilge
Soma Festival (Castlewellan, Northern Ireland)
 Willie Clancy Summer School (Milltown Malbay, Ireland)

Italy
Montelago Celtic Night (Colfiorito, Macerata, Italy)
Monterenzio Celtica, I Fuochi di Taranis, Monterenzio, Bologna, Emilia Romagna
Abruzzo Irish Festival, in Notaresco, Teramo, Abruzzo
Bundan Celtic Festival, in Stellata, Ferrara, Emilia Romagna
Celtica, in Courmayeur, Valle d'Aosta
Montelago Celtic Festival, in Piana di Colfiorito, Serravalle di Chienti, Marche
Triskell Celtic Festival (Trieste, Italy)
Celtival, in Giavera del Montello, Treviso, Veneto
Brintaal Celtic Folk, in Valstagna, Vicenza, Veneto

Spain
 Celtic Night "Noche Celta" Festival in Mijas Pueblo Main Square, Mijas, Málaga, Andalusia
 Interceltic Festival of Avilés or "Festival Intercéltico de Avilés" (Avilés, Asturies, Spain)
Ortigueira's Festival of Celtic World, Galicia
Festival Internacional do Mundo Celta de Ortigueira (Ortigueira, Galicia, Spain)
Folixa na Primavera (Mieres, Asturies, Spain)
Festival Celta Internacional Reino de León, (León, Spain)
Festival Internacional de Música Celta de Collado Villalba (Collado Villalba, Spain)

Poland
Zamek Festival, in Będzin

Portugal
Festival Intercéltico de Sendim (Sendim, Portugal)
Galaicofolia (Esposende, Portugal)
Festival Folk Celta Ponte da Barca (Ponte da Barca, Portugal)
Douro Celtic Fest (Vila Nova de Gaia, Portugal)

Romania
Festivalul Celtic (Transylvania,  Beclean City)

United Kingdom
Scotland
 Celtic Connections, Glasgow
 Fèis Bharraigh, Barra Fest, Isle of Barra
 Royal National Mòd, Am Mòd Nàiseanta Rìoghail (Glasgow, Scotland)
Hebridean Celtic Festival (Stornoway, Scotland)

Wales
 National Eisteddfod of Wales, Eisteddfod Genedlaethol Cymru
 Urdd National Eisteddfod, Eisteddfod Yr Urdd
 Llangollen International Music Eisteddfod, Eisteddfod Llangollen 

Cornwall
 AberFest, held in Falmouth (Aberfal) (alternating with Breizh-Kernow Festival in Brittany)
 Perranzabuloe, Lowender Peran, held at Perranporth, Cornwall, in honour of St Piran
Isle of Man
Yn Chruinnaght (Isle of Man)

South America

Brazil
 Festival Celta Brasil, Campinas. São Paulo

North America

Canada
 Celtic Colours, Cape Breton Island. Nova Scotia
 Goderich Celtic Roots Festival
 Russell CelticFest
 Almonte Celtfest
 Vancouver Celtic Festival
 Festival celtique de Québec or Québec city Celtic festival, (Quebec city, Quebec, Canada)
Festival Mémoire et Racines (Joliette, Quebec, Canada)
Miramichi Irish Festival

United States
Kansas City Irish Festival in Kansas City, MO.
Philadelphia Fleadh In Philadelphia, PA. In early May.
Irish Fest Camden in Camden, South Carolina
Bitterroot Celtic Games & Gathering, Hamilton MT. Every 3rd weekend in August. 
Samhain Celtic New Year Festival, organized by the Ceili of the Valley Society, in Salem, Oregon
Sonora Celtic Faire The Official First Celtic Faire in the USA: Sonora, California
Celtic Music & Heritage Festival in America's Oldest CELTIC City: St. Augustine, Florida
Milwaukee Irish Fest in Milwaukee, WI
Finger Lakes Highland Games and Celtic Festival in Farmington, NY
Houston Celtic Festival & Highland Games Houston, TX
Saline Celtic Festival in Saline, Michigan
Dunedin Celtic Music Craft Beer Festival in Dunedin, FL
Dublin Irish Festival in Dublin, Ohio
Celtic Classic, in Bethlehem, Pennsylvania
Frederick Celtic Festival, a Scottish festival held annually in Urbana, Maryland
Malad Valley Welsh Festival in Idaho
Celtic Harvest Festival in Sedona, Arizona
Dayton Celtic Festival in Dayton, Ohio
Ormond Beach Celtic Festival in Ormond Beach, Florida
Celtic Fest Mississippi in Jackson, Mississippi
Tampa Bay Tartan Ball in Tampa, Florida
Los Angeles St. David's Day Festival, a Welsh festival held annually in Los Angeles, California
Celtic Festival and Highland Games, Quad Cities in Davenport, Iowa
North Texas Irish Festival in Dallas, TX
Texas Scottish Festival and Highland Games in Arlington, TX
Scottish Fest USA in Orange County, Southern California
Scottish Festival & Celtic Gathering in Bridgeport, West Virginia
Tucson Celtic Festival and Highland Games in Tucson, Arizona
U.S. National Mòd during the annual Highland games in Ligonier, Pennsylvania.
Houston Celtic Festival and Highland Games in Houston, Texas
Sherwood Celtic Music Festival in McDade, TX
Arizona Scottish Gathering and Highland Games in Phoenix, Az
San Antonio Highland Games & Celtic Music Festival in Helotes, Texas
KVMR Celtic Festival in Grass Valley, California
Iowa Irish Fest in Waterloo, Iowa First weekend in August

3 Celtic Festivals annually in New Mexico: RGVCF hosts one in May in Bernalillo City and another in October in the city of Edgewood.  Also in October, Aztec city up in the 4 Corners area holds theirs.

Caribbean

Barbados
Celtic Festival Barbados in Barbados, Caribbean

Cuba
CeltFest Cuba in Havana, Cuba

Africa

South Africa
 Celtic Fest South Africa in Modderfontein, Gauteng, South Africa
 Celtic Festival, Knysna, Western Cape

Gallery

References

External links

Celtic Revival
Celtic
Celtic
 a
Celtic
Lists of religious music festivals